
Gmina Łobżenica is an urban-rural gmina (administrative district) in Piła County, Greater Poland Voivodeship, in west-central Poland.

Villages
Apart from the town of Łobżenica, Gmina Łobżenica contains the villages and settlements of Biegodzin, Chlebno, Dębno, Dziegciarnia, Dziunin, Dźwierszno Małe, Dźwierszno Wielkie, Fanianowo, Ferdynandowo, Izdebki, Józefinowo, Kościerzyn Mały, Kruszki, Kunowo, Liszkowo, Łobżonka, Luchowo, Młynowo, Nowina, Piesno, Puszczka, Rataje, Stebionek, Szczerbin, Topola, Trzeboń, Walentynowo, Wiktorówko, Witrogoszcz, Witrogoszcz-Kolonia, Witrogoszcz-Osada, Zawada and Zdroje.

Neighbouring gminas
Gmina Łobżenica is bordered by the gminas of Mrocza, Sadki, Więcbork, Wyrzysk, Wysoka and Złotów.

References
Polish official population figures 2006

Lobzenica
Piła County